Prince Heinrich Wilhelm Konstantin Viktor Franz of Hesse-Kassel (30 October 1927 – 18 November 1999), known as Enrico d'Assia, was the second child of Prince Philipp of Hesse and Princess Mafalda of Savoy. Heinrich became an artist, set designer, and memoirist after World War II.

Life 
Prince Heinrich was born in Rome, Italy, as the second son of Prince Philipp of Hesse and Princess Mafalda of Savoy, daughter of King Victor Emmanuel III of Italy.

During the Second World War, Heinrich's father, an important former aristocratic Nazi party member, was arrested by the Gestapo. His mother was detained and imprisoned in Buchenwald concentration camp, where she was killed by Allies' bombardments in 1944. Heinrich and his siblings (Moritz, Otto and Elisabeth) were given sanctuary in the Vatican. After the War they were reunited with their father in Germany. 

Heinrich was an artist and set designer, active mainly in Italy under the name Enrico d'Assia. He published a volume of memoirs, notably Der Kristallene Lüster (1994). He died in Frankfurt, unmarried.

Ancestry

References

Hesse, Heinrich, Prince of
Hesse, Heinrich, Prince of
Heinrich of Hesse-Kassel
German princes